Below are some of common festivities associated with, or observed by the Dutch ethnic group. Included are cultural feasts. National holidays, of for example the Netherlands (such as Queen's Day) are omitted. Major festivities include: 
Feast of Saint Nicholas. The feast celebrates the name day of Saint Nicholas, patron saint of, among other things, children, who are the principal focus of the feast. They receive presents, candy and poems. The origins of Saint Nicholas appear to be Christian, but in fact originate from ancient Germanic mythology, with Dutch figure of Sinterklaas representing the god Odin. Both have a beard, hat and spear (nowadays a staff) and the cloth bag held by the servants to capture naughty children. Both Saint Nicolas and Odin ride white horses that can fly through the air. The letters made of chocolate given by the Zwarte Pieten to the children evokes the fact that Odin ‘invented’ the rune letters. The poems made during the celebration and the songs the children sing relate to Odin as the god of the arts of poetry. It's celebrated on December 5 or 6. 
Christmas. Among the Dutch, Christmas (which lasts two days) is a time of togetherness. Gifts are generally not exchanged. Usually it is celebrated with ones direct, and not extended, family. It's celebrated on December 25 and 26. 
New Year's Eve. The Dutch generally celebrate New Year's Eve, which is called Old Years' Night in Dutch, with friends and family. On this day, traditional New Years pastries like Oliebollen are eaten. At mid-night the Dutch wish all the best to all in their presence and fire works are set off. Following these activities it is customary to express a good intention for the next year. The following morning is marked by visits to family, usually parents. It's celebrated on December 31.  
Kermesse. Originally denoting the mass said on the anniversary of the foundation of a church (or the parish) and in honour of the patron. Today Kermesse denotes the celebrations of such an anniversary. Many towns and larger villages hold their own Kermesse once every year. It can best be described as a mix of feasting, dancing, sports and funfair attractions.
Birthday. Birthdays, called Year days in Dutch, are greeted with enthusiasm in Dutch culture. Family and friends will probably visit, call or send a card. It is considered to be anti-social for a person to ignore his or her own birthday. Among the Dutch, instead of people showering the birthday person with special treats, it is the birthday person's place to treat those around him or her. This is exemplified by the custom to bring pastries for colleagues to work; and at school children bring treats for all their classmates. Dutch people generally keep a special Birthday calendar, often to be found in the bathroom of their houses.

See also
Dutch people

Dutch culture